Kunjana Ghimire, popularly known by her serial name Suntali is a Nepalese philanthropist, comedian, actor and a social worker. She is one of the main characters of the Nepali TV series Meri Bassai. She is considered one of the Nepal's talented and good comedian ever because she had played various roles in her own sitcom Meri Bassai. She is highly active in social work.

Early life

She was born in the Lalitpur District of Nepal where her early life and schooling were completed. She used to help her father in his field during her schooling. She used to perform dancing during her school life. Her dances were well appreciated by many people. So, she ran away from this field hoping to be a good dancer, actor, and comedian. Her first successful career as an actor was Meri Bassai. There, she met Sitaram Kattel and fell in love with him. They married in 2009.

Career

She started to play the role of Suntali, love interest, and later the wife of Dhurmus in the Nepali television program Meri Bassai from 2006. Her acting career got popularly highlighted as her role, acting and the television program became highly acclaimed among the Nepalese citizens.

Social works

Dhurmus Suntali Foundation

Kunjana Ghimire, along with Sitaram Kattel is a founding member of Dhurmus Suntali Foundation. The foundation recently completed Sindhupalchock Giranchour Integrated Model Colony Construction Project. The formal handing ceremony was held on 28 October 2016 in the presence of President Bidhya Devi Bhandari, parents of Sitaram and Kunjana, Madan Krishna Shrestha and Hari Bansha Acharya. The construction project has built a colony of 67 houses with dedicated areas for children parks, public taps, public toilets, parking areas and health post. The colony is dedicated to the victims of the April 2015 Nepal earthquake.

Cleanliness programs
They are providing information related to cleanliness all over Nepal. They have run a campaign for cleaning the Bagmati river of Kathmandu, one of the holy rivers of Nepal that flow beside the Pashupatinath Temple. Appreciating and following the path of DhurmusSuntali, many different groups and social clubs have been established in Nepal to carry on the various cleanliness and social awareness programs in various places. Suntali (Kunjana Ghimire) and Dhurmus (Sitaram Kattel) are cleanliness ambassador of the Nepal Government.

Filmography

Television
Meri Bassai

References

External links
Official website

Living people
Nepalese women comedians
People from Lalitpur District, Nepal
Khas people
1989 births
21st-century Nepalese actresses
Nepalese social workers